Criss Angel Mindfreak is an American reality television series that aired on A&E from July 20, 2005, to September 8, 2010. It centers on stunts and street magic acts by magician Criss Angel.

Releases

See also
List of Criss Angel Mindfreak episodes
Criss Angel BeLIEve

References

External links
 
 

2005 American television series debuts
2000s American reality television series
2010 American television series endings
2010s American reality television series
A&E (TV network) original programming
Television shows set in the Las Vegas Valley
English-language television shows
American television magic shows
Las Vegas shows